Sweden competed at the 1992 Winter Olympics in Albertville, France.

Medalists

Competitors
The following is the list of number of competitors in the Games.

Alpine skiing

Men

Women

Biathlon

Men

Men's 4 × 7.5 km relay

Women

Women's 3 × 7.5 km relay

 1 A penalty loop of 150 metres had to be skied per missed target.
 2 One minute added per missed target.

Cross-country skiing

Men

 1 Starting delay based on 10 km results. 
 C = Classical style, F = Freestyle

Men's 4 × 10 km relay

Women

 2 Starting delay based on 5 km results. 
 C = Classical style, F = Freestyle

Women's 4 × 5 km relay

Curling

Curling was a demonstration sport at the 1992 Winter Olympics.

Figure skating

Women

Freestyle skiing

Men

Women

Ice hockey

Summary

Group A
Twelve participating teams were placed in two groups. After playing a round-robin, the top four teams in each group advanced to the Medal Round while the last two teams competed in the consolation round for the 9th to 12th places.

Final round
Quarter-finals

Consolation round 5th-8th places

5th-place match

Team roster:
Roger Nordström
Tommy Söderström
Peter Andersson
Peter Andersson
Kenneth Kennholt
Petri Liimatainen
Börje Salming
Tommy Sjödin
Fredrik Stillman
Charles Berglund
Patrik Carnbäck
Lars Edström
Patrik Erickson
Peter Ottosson
Bengt-Åke Gustafsson
Mikael Johansson
Patric Kjellberg
Håkan Loob
Mats Näslund
Thomas Rundqvist
Daniel Rydmark
Jan Viktorsson
Head coach: Conny Evensson

Luge

Men

(Men's) Doubles

Ski jumping 

Men's team large hill

 1 Four teams members performed two jumps each. The best three were counted.

Speed skating

Men

Women

References

 Olympic Winter Games 1992, full results by sports-reference.com

Nations at the 1992 Winter Olympics
1992
Winter Olympics